Labidomera is a genus of leaf beetles.

Taxonomy
The genus Labidomera is assigned to the chrysomelid beetle tribe Chrysomelini (in subfamily Chrysomelinae).

Distribution
The native range of Labidomera clivicollis is North America, from southern Canada to the central United States. The other species are farther south.

Species
Labidomera clivicollis (Kirby 1837)
Labidomera suturella
(Two more species)

References

Chrysomelinae
Chrysomelidae genera
Taxa named by Louis Alexandre Auguste Chevrolat